Neal K. Van Alfen is an American plant pathologist. He was the dean of the UC Davis College of Agricultural and Environmental Sciences from 1999 to 2012 and the editor of the Annual Review of Phytopathology from 2004 to 2014.

Early life and education
Neal K. Van Alfen was born to parents Marguerite  and Gerrit Van Alfen. Gerrit Van Alfen was an emigrant from the Netherlands. He grew up in Modesto, California and worked farm-related jobs in his youth, including harvesting peaches and on chicken farms. He attended Brigham Young University for his bachelor's degree in chemistry and his master's degree in botany. For his PhD he attended the University of California, Davis, majoring in plant pathology.

Career
He taught at Utah State University and Texas A&M University before returning to UC Davis. He researched problems in international agricultural systems, including those of China, Taiwan, Vietnam, Thailand, Israel and Kazakhstan. He became the dean of the College of Agricultural and Environmental Sciences in 1999. He retired from his position as dean in 2012. Upon his retirement, he became a dean emeritus and professor emeritus of plant pathology.

His works include editing the Encyclopedia of Agriculture and Food Systems. He was also the editor of the Annual Review of Phytopathology from 2004–2014.

Awards and honors
He is a fellow of the American Association for the Advancement of Science and the American Phytopathological Society. He is also an honorary fellow of the California Agricultural Leadership Foundation and a former president of the American Phytopathological Society.

Personal life
After retiring from UC Davis, he returned to farming on his property in Winters, California in Yolo County. He grows citrus, grapes, and olives. He also serves as the vice president of the Yolo Land Trust. He is married to Pam Kazmierczak.

References

Living people
Fellows of the American Association for the Advancement of Science
American phytopathologists
American people of Dutch descent
Year of birth missing (living people)
Brigham Young University alumni
University of California, Davis alumni
Utah State University faculty
Texas A&M University faculty
University of California, Davis faculty
Annual Reviews (publisher) editors